"Love After War" is a song by American recording artist Robin Thicke. The R&B ballad is the lead single from his fifth studio album Love After War (2011). It was released to the radio on October 20, 2011, reaching number 14 on the US Hot R&B/Hip-Hop Songs chart.

Music video
The music video for "Love After War," directed by Hype Williams, premiered on November 21, 2011. It features Thicke's wife, actress Paula Patton.

Charts

Weekly charts

Year-end charts

Release history

References

2011 singles
Robin Thicke songs
Song recordings produced by Polow da Don
Songs written by Robin Thicke
Music videos directed by Hype Williams
2010s ballads
Contemporary R&B ballads
Pop ballads
Soul ballads